Euro Health Consumer Index (EHCI) was a comparison of European health care systems based on waiting times, results, and generosity. The information is presented as a graphic index. EHCI was produced 2005–2009 and 2012–2018 by Health Consumer Powerhouse. The 2014 ranking included 37 countries measured by 48 indicators.  It claimed to measure the "consumer friendliness" of healthcare systems. It did not claim to measure which European state had the best healthcare system, but it did produce specialist Indexes on Diabetes, Cardiac Care, HIV, Headache and Hepatitis. 

In 2006 France was the champion with 768 points out of 1000. In the 2015 results the same performance would have given the 13th position among 35 countries because of the widespread improvements in standards.

While no bias in favour of any health system was alleged, the index was criticised in the British Medical Journal by Martin McKee and others from the European Observatory on Health Systems and Policies in February 2016.  Points they made included: 
 The index is constructed by scoring performance as good, intermediary or not-so-good, based on arbitrary cut-off points. 
 There is no logic in how many points are allocated to each indicator.  225 points are allocated to accessibility, but only 250 to health outcomes.
 The indicators are a  mix of trends over time and cross-sectional rankings.

A survey by the Centre for Population Change in 2019 produced results consistent with the index.

Euro Health Consumer Index 2018

Euro Health Consumer Index 2016

Euro Health Consumer Index 2015

Euro Health Consumer Index 2014

References

External links
 EHCI 2005–2009
 EHCI 2014
 EHCI 2015
 EHCI 2016
 EHCI 2017
 EHCI 2018

Health care quality
Health in Europe